EML Vaindlo (M416) was a Frauenlob-class minelayer of the Estonian Navy and belonged into the Estonian Navy Mineships Division.

Introduction
The minelayer Vaindlo is a vessel of the Estonian Navy Mineships Division and also the second modernized Frauenlob class minelayer. A silver star cross represents the light tower on the coat of arms of the vessel. The light tower also symbolizes the international connections between Estonia and her allies. The Red Saint George remembers the fallen British sailors in 1721, whose memorial plate is situated at  Vaindloo island. The star cross is placed on Vihula´s municipality coat of arms and combined with the golden and silver lines they represent the ancient Estonian agriculture. The ship's motto is in Latin "Memento" which means in English "Remember". The coat of arms was designed by Priit Herodes. In 2003 a cooperation contract was signed between the Kunda city council and the minelayer Vaindlo which gave the vessel a right to wear the Kunda town coat of arms and to introduce the city in all foreign harbors across the world.

History
EML Vaindlo (M416) was built in West-Germany, at the Krögerwerft shipyard in Rendsburg for the Bundesmarine as Undine. The vessel was launched on the 16 May 1966 and entered service a year later in 1967. The German Navy decommissioned her in 2002 and gave the ship to the Estonian Navy who renamed her Vaindlo.Vaindlo was decommissioned with EML Olev in 2005. Then they were sold in 2008 to private owners, they both stood "abandoned" in Tallinn Seaplane Harbor till Vaindlo was towed to Hara Submarine Base in 2018. Then she was stripped of her superstructure in 2020. She is currently half sunken in Hara harbour.

See also
BALTRON project

References

External links

Estonian Navy

Frauenlob-class minesweepers
Ships built in Rendsburg
1966 ships
Cold War minesweepers of Germany
Frauenlob-class minesweepers of the Estonian Navy
Estonian Mineships Division